"Where Are You Baby?" is a song by English singer, songwriter and pop-rap artist Betty Boo, included on her debut album, Boomania (1990). It was released as a single in July 1990, peaking at number three on the UK Singles Chart in September 1990 and earning a Silver certification from the British Phonographic Industry on New Year's Day 1991. Outside the United Kingdom, the single reached number six in Ireland, number 10 in Spain, number 11 in New Zealand, and number 13 in Switzerland. It also charted in Australia, Germany, and the Netherlands. The song features a prominent sample of the Velvelettes song "He Was Really Sayin' Somethin'".

Critical reception
Steve Hochman from Los Angeles Times felt that "Where Are You Baby?" "is as engaging a bit of pop fluff as you’re likely to find, as wonderfully frothy as Bananarama’s early best—if not Lesley Gore’s." Paul Lester from Melody Maker said that the song "sounds like it was crafted by several experts with years of experience in how to contrive sublime chart noise." David Giles from Music Week wrote that the follow-up to the hugely successful "Doin' the Do" "should fare even better, since it possesses an instantly alluring chorus with distinct traces of Motown acts like the Supremes and Martha Reeves. A possible number one?"

Track listings
 CD(LEFT 43CD)
 "Where Are You Baby?" (radio edit)
 "Boo's Boogie" (12-inch version)
 "Where Are You Baby?" (12-inch mix)

 7-inch(LEFT 43) / cassette (LEFT 43C)
 "Where Are You Baby?" (radio edit)
 "Boo's Boogie" (7-inch version)

 12-inch(LEFT 43T)
 "Where Are You Baby?" (12-inch mix)
 "Boo's Boogie" (12-inch version)

Charts

Certifications

References

1990 singles
1990 songs
Betty Boo songs
Songs written by Betty Boo